Antonela Radeljić (born 9 December 1996) is a Bosnian football defender who plays for ŽNK Osijek.

External links 
 

1996 births
Living people
Bosnia and Herzegovina women's footballers
Women's association football defenders
Bosnia and Herzegovina women's international footballers